Bould is a surname, and may refer to:

 Beckett Bould (1880–1970), British actor
 Bruce Bould (born 1949), English actor
 Fred Bould (born 1964), American product designer
 George Bould (1887–1958), English footballer
 Sophie Bould, British theatre and TV actress
 Steve Bould (born 1962), English footballer and coach

See also
 Bold (surname)
 Boult (surname)
 Bolder
 Boulder (disambiguation)